Nizhnyaya Omka is the name of several rural localities (selos and villages) in Nizhneomsky District of Omsk Oblast, Russia:
Nizhnyaya Omka, Nizhneomsky Rural Okrug, Nizhneomsky District, Omsk Oblast, a selo in Nizhneomsky Rural Okrug
Nizhnyaya Omka, Solovetsky Rural Okrug, Nizhneomsky District, Omsk Oblast, a village in Solovetsky Rural Okrug